Coryphistes is a genus of short-horned grasshoppers in the family Acrididae. There are at least three described species in Coryphistes, found in Australia.

Species
These species belong to the genus Coryphistes:
 Coryphistes glabriceps Sjöstedt, 1920 (Redlands Coryphistes)
 Coryphistes interioris Tepper, 1896 (Hairy Coryphistes)
 Coryphistes ruricola (Burmeister, 1838) (Bark-mimicking Grasshopper)

References

External links

 

Acrididae